Amelia is an EP by Burning Star Core, released in 2003 by Thin Wrist Recordings.

Track listing

Personnel
Adapted from the Amelia liner notes.
 C. Spencer Yeh – instruments

Release history

References

External links 
 

2003 EPs
Burning Star Core albums
Instrumental EPs